G. Dupoitt (fl. ca. 1420–1430) was a composer, presumed to be French, about whom little is known. His only known work is the three-voice motet "Salve mater misericordie, stella maris," found in the Trent Codices (I-TRbc 92, 135v–136). There the piece is attributed to G. Dupoitt, but the name has often been misread as G. Dupont. It is possible the name is a corruption or alternative spelling of Dubois.

The motet text also appears in a 13th-century English conductus found in Oxford Bodleian Library manuscripts GB-Ob 489 and 591. According to musicologist Peter Wright, Dupoitt's setting is awkward in its melodic and harmonic writing, though its mensural usage is of interest.

References

External link

Year of birth unknown
Year of death unknown
Renaissance composers
15th-century French composers